During the 1989-90 season A.C. Fiorentina competed in Serie A, Coppa Italia and UEFA Cup.

Summary 

During summer Swedish manager Sven-Göran Eriksson left the club to manage Benfica. Then, the club appointed Bruno Giorgi who has fired on 1 May 1990. New coach Francesco Graziani, manage the team avoiding relegation  to 1990-91 Serie B with a 4-1 against Atalanta B.C. in the last round of the League tournament.

The club transferred out forward Stefano Borgonovo to A.C. Milan, replaced by Argentine striker Oscar Dertycia who was injured during half of campaign. Swedish central back Glenn Hysén signed with an English club. Other arrivals were Renato Buso, Giuseppe Volpecina, Stefano Pioli, Czech midfielder Luboš Kubík, Giuseppe Iachini, Marco Nappi, Mario Faccenda and young players such as Alberto Malusci and Giacomo Banchelli.

Owing to rebuilding actions in its Comunale for the upcoming 1990 FIFA World Cup the squad played several matches in Pistoia, Perugia and Arezzo.

In Coppa Italia the team won over Licata, in second round eliminated Como 1907, reaching the semifinals stage, being eliminated by Maradona S.S.C. Napoli's.

In UEFA Cup the squad eliminated Atletico Madrid, Sochaux, Dinamo Kyiv, AJ Auxerre and Werder Bremen, reaching the Final against Juventus, being the first Italian final in the history of UEFA tournaments. The team was defeated after two legs, included a fans riot in Avellino a location appointed by UEFA after a previous riot in semifinals against Werder Bremen.

The club disputed three finals in three UEFA tournaments in its history: European Cup (on 31 May 1957 lost against Real Madrid), UEFA Cup Winners' Cup (on 17 and 27 May 1961 defeated Glasgow Rangers and lost against Atletico Madrid on 5 September 1962) and UEFA Cup (on 2 and 16 May 1990 lost against Juventus).

One day after the 1990 UEFA Cup Final match lost, the Pontello announced the transfer out of Roberto Baggio to Juventus. Then, a roit of the viola fans erupted in Firenze with attacks to the club owners home. The riot was out of control several days including Viola fans arrests.

During summer of 1990, the viola fans continued their riots, this time against the Italy national football team and the upcoming 1990 FIFA World Cup in Coverciano nearby Firenze until the Italian Football Federation relocated the squad to  Marino, nearby Roma due to safety concerns.

Squad

Transfers

Competitions

Serie A

League table

Result by round

Matches

Coppa Italia

Qualifying round

Groups stage

UEFA Cup

Round of 64

Round of 32

Eightfinals

Quarterfinals

Semifinals

Finals

Statistics

Players statistics

Coppa Italia goalscorers 

 2 - Battistini
 1 - Dunga, Di Chiara, Baggio, Bosco, Dertycia

UEFA Cup goalscorers 

 3 - Buso
 2 - Nappi
 1 - Baggio, Volpecina

References

Books

External links 
 
 

ACF Fiorentina seasons
Fiorentina